Burnt Sienna may refer to:

 Burnt sienna, an earth pigment
 Burnt Sienna (album), a 1992 album by Azalia Snail
 "Burnt Sienna" (song), a 1993 song by Margaret Urlich